Dul may refer to:
Dul Madoba, a Somali group
Dul Koeun, Cambodian politician
Dul Rural District, in West Azerbaijan Province, Iran

See also
DUL (disambiguation)